Christ-Emmanuel Faitout Maouassa (born 6 July 1998) is a French professional footballer who plays as a left-back for Ligue 1 club Montpellier, on loan from Belgian First Division A side Club Brugge.

Club career
Maouassa came through the youth section of Nancy. He made his Ligue 2 debut on 3 August 2015 in a match against Tours. On 16 June 2017, Maouassa signed a four-year deal with Ligue 1 club Rennes after Nancy had suffered relegation.

On 31 August 2021, Maouassa signed for Belgian side Club Brugge. He was loaned back to Ligue 1 with Montpellier on 21 June 2022.

International career
Maouassa was born in France to parents from the Republic of the Congo. He is a youth international for France.

Career statistics

Honours
France U17
UEFA European Under-17 Championship: 2015
France U19
UEFA European Under-19 Championship: 2016
Individual
 UEFA European Under-19 Championship Team of the Tournament: 2016

References

External links
 

Living people
1998 births
People from Villepinte, Seine-Saint-Denis
Footballers from Seine-Saint-Denis
Association football defenders
French footballers
France youth international footballers
French sportspeople of Republic of the Congo descent
AS Nancy Lorraine players
Stade Rennais F.C. players
Nîmes Olympique players
Club Brugge KV players
Montpellier HSC players
Ligue 1 players
Ligue 2 players
Championnat National 2 players
Championnat National 3 players
Belgian Pro League players
Black French sportspeople
French expatriate footballers
Expatriate footballers in Belgium
French expatriate sportspeople in Belgium